The Treaty of Arras was signed at Arras on 23 December 1482 by King Louis XI of France and Archduke Maximilian I of Habsburg as heir of the Burgundian Netherlands in the course of the Burgundian succession crisis.

The dukes from the House of Valois-Burgundy, a cadet branch of the French royal House of Valois, had ruled over a significant amount of territories on both sides of the border between the Kingdom of France and the Holy Roman Empire. When the last Burgundian duke Charles the Bold died at the Battle of Nancy on 5 January 1477, his territories in France including Burgundy proper, Flanders, Artois and the Picardy were seized as reverted fiefs by the French king. Before his death however, Charles had arranged with Emperor Frederick III of Habsburg the marriage of their children Mary the Rich and Archduke Maximilian, which took place on 19 August 1477.

Maximilian did not hesitate to defend the heritage of his wife, culminating in the 1479 Battle of Guinegate, where he defeated the troops of King Louis XI. However, after Mary of Burgundy died on 27 March 1482, leaving the inheritance of her father to Philip, their son, Maximilian had to cope with difficulties to prevail as an accepted regent for their son. To settle the conflict with France, he by the Treaty of Arras agreed to marry his daughter, Archduchess Margaret of Austria, to the Dauphin of France, the later King Charles VIII, bringing the Imperial County of Burgundy to the French crown as her dowry. France retained most of its Burgundian fiefdoms except for the affluent County of Flanders, which passed to Maximilian (but soon rebelled against the archduke).

Although the betrothal was later renounced and Charles VIII would marry Duchess Anne of Brittany, the Burgundian inheritance effectively remained under French control thus ending the dream of a Burgundian kingdom or an independent Duchy of Burgundy once and for all. Maximilian however remained dissatisfied with the agreement and in 1493 forced King Charles VIII to sign the Treaty of Senlis, by which he re-acquired the County of Burgundy as well as the French counties of Charolais and Artois.

References

See also
List of treaties

Atrecht
1480s in France
1480s in the Holy Roman Empire
1482 in Europe
1480s treaties
Arras (1482)
Treaties of the Burgundian Netherlands
Maximilian I, Holy Roman Emperor